Nigel Auchterlounie is a British comics artist and cartoonist. His graphic novel, Spleenal, was published by Blank Slate Books in 2009. His artwork also featured heavily in the children's comic The Dandy, often writing the strips himself.

For the final print Dandy celebrating its 75th anniversary, Nigel drew The Bogies, My Freaky Family, Tom Tum, Bertie Buncle and his Chemical Uncle, Joe White and the Seven Dwarves, Old King Cole, Korky the Cat and Jibber and Steve as well as writing The Jocks and the Geordies.

In November 2012, Auchterlounie became the writer of Dennis the Menace as well as the writer/artist for Pup Parade for The Beano. Nigel currently writes Dennis the Menace and Gnasher in both the weekly comic and in the Dennis the Menace and Gnasher Megazine. Nigel both writes and draws The Numskulls.

Children's comic work

Dennis the Menace Present The Beano Strips

References

External links
Nigel Auchterlounie's blog
Nigel Auchterlounie's portfolio at Cartoonstock

British comics artists
British comics writers
British cartoonists
Living people
The Dandy people
The Beano people
Year of birth missing (living people)
Dennis the Menace and Gnasher